= Radderahatti =

Radderahatti, Karnataka ರಡ್ಡೇರಹಟ್ಟಿ
- village
- Location in Karnataka, India Radderahatti, Karnataka (India)
- Coordinates: 16.42°N 74.58°E
- Country: India
- State: Karnataka
- District: Belgaum
- Talukas: Athani

Government
  - Type: Panchayat raj
  - Body: Gram panchayat

Population (2011)
  - Total: 5,700

Languages
  - Official: Kannada
- Time zone: UTC+5:30 (IST)
- Postal code: 591240
- ISO 3166 code: IN-KA
- Vehicle registration: KA71
- Website: karnataka.gov.in

Radderahatti is a small village in Athani Taluk in Belagavi districtKarnataka, India. It comes under Radderahatti Grama Panchayath with 13 members.It is located 124 km (77 mi) north of district headquarters Belagavi, 10 km (6.2 mi) from Athani and 570 km (350 mi) from the state capital Bangalore. The local language is Kannada and the population is 5700 with 1138 houses. The female population is 49.3%, the overall literacy rate is 72.4% and the female literacy rate is 61.3%. Basaveshwara temple, Girimalleshwar Math, and Durgadevi temple are some spiritual and religious places.
